Arenigobius frenatus, commonly known as the half-bridled goby, is a fish native to the waters of eastern Australia. It occurs in the tropical and temperate waters of eastern Australia being distributed from Cape Tribulation, Queensland, to Flinders Island, Tasmania, and west along Australia's south coast to Port Phillip Bay, Victoria. They feed on benthic invertebrates.

References

frenatus
Fish described in 1861
Taxa named by Albert Günther